Keezhthonnakkal  is a village in Thiruvananthapuram district in the state of Kerala, India.

Demographics
 India census, Keezhthonnakkal had a population of 11638 with 5540 males and 6098 females.

References

Villages in Thiruvananthapuram district